List of rivers flowing in the island of Flores, East Nusa Tenggara province, Indonesia.

In alphabetical order

See also
 List of rivers of Indonesia
 List of rivers of Lesser Sunda Islands

References

 
Flores
Flores